The 1991 Hamilton Tiger-Cats season was the 34th season for the team in the Canadian Football League and their 42nd overall. The Tiger-Cats finished in 4th place in the East Division with a 3–15 record and failed to make the playoffs. It was the first time in team history (under the Tiger-Cats banner) that the Tiger-Cats missed the playoffs in consecutive years.

Offseason

CFL Draft

Preseason

Regular season

Season standings

Season schedule

Awards and honours

1991 CFL All-Stars

References

Hamilton Tiger-Cats seasons
Ham